Thomas Jonathan Bateman (born 15 March 1989) is a British actor, best known for his roles on the historical fantasy drama series Da Vinci's Demons (2013–2015), and in the film Murder on the Orient Express (2017) and its sequel Death on the Nile (2022).

Early life
Bateman was born in Oxford, Oxfordshire, to a working-class family. He has 12 siblings, including a twin brother named Merlin.

Bateman studied drama at the London Academy of Music and Dramatic Art (LAMDA), where he appeared in a production of Much Ado About Nothing with Catherine Tate and David Tennant. He later joined Kenneth Branagh's company at the Garrick Theatre, where he acted alongside Judi Dench in The Winter's Tale.

Personal life
Since 2017, Bateman has been in a relationship with actress Daisy Ridley, whom he met on the set of Murder on the Orient Express. In January 2023, during her promotion of Sometimes I Think About Dying at the Sundance Film Festival, Ridley confirmed that she and Bateman had married.

Filmography

Film

Television
2023 
Funny woman (British tv series) 
Clive
6 episodes

References

External links

1989 births
Living people
British male film actors
British male television actors
Male actors from Oxfordshire
Actors from Oxford
21st-century British male actors